Nebrarctia transversa is a moth of the family Erebidae. It is found in India, Pakistan, Afghanistan and Tajikistan.

Subspecies
Nebrarctia transversa transversa (north-western India and western Pakistan)
Nebrarctia transversa puella (Staudinger, 1887) (central Asia)
Nebrarctia transversa vartianae (Daniel, 1965) (eastern Afghanistan)

References

Moths described in 1879
Spilosomina